This is a list of films which have placed number one at the weekend box office in the Philippines during 2008.

Total Gross

*Local Film

Notes

References
 Note: Click on the relevant weekend to view specifics.

Philippines
Numb
2008